Oklahoma City Hindu Temple is a Hindu Temple located in Oklahoma City, Oklahoma.

History
In 1989 a 4,000 Sq Foot Hindu Temple was built in Oklahoma City to serve the 1,000 hindus that lived in the Oklahoma City Metropolitan Area at the time. During the 90s the Hindu campus gained 5 acres north of the temple. Following the expansion numerous improvements were made such as a connection to the city's water lines and the installation of a fire hydrant. In 2004, the temple celebrated a grand re-opening following more renovations such as a new heating/cooling system and a expanded parking lot. The main deity of the temple is Venkateswara.

References

Buildings and structures in Oklahoma County, Oklahoma
Hinduism in the United States
Religious buildings and structures completed in 1989
Religious organizations established in 1989
1989 establishments in Oklahoma
Asian-American culture in Oklahoma
Indian-American culture in Oklahoma